David Hunt is an English actor, producer, and director who has worked in both the United Kingdom and the United States. His best known U.S. film role is Harlan Rook, in the 1988 action film The Dead Pool, the fifth installment in the Dirty Harry series. He has also had guest roles on the television sitcom Everybody Loves Raymond as Ray's nemesis neighbor, Bill Parker. He also appeared in the recurring role of Darren McCarthy during season 6 of 24. Back in the UK, Hunt was in the 1991 award-winning period drama, The Black Velvet Gown, as well as being a regular cast member of the series Beck for the BBC.

In 2005, Hunt directed the documentary The Bituminous Coal Queens of Pennsylvania, which won a Crystal Heart Award at the Heartland Film Festival. Other film appearances include The Deal with William H. Macy, Meg Ryan and Jason Ritter and Moms' Night Out.

Amongst Hunt's productions are the romantic comedy The Engagement Ring, a two-hour movie for TNT in which he also starred; Amazing Grace, a motion picture directed by Michael Apted and starring Albert Finney; and the television comedy Versailles, which he directed.

Biography 
Hunt graduated from Loughborough University, Leicestershire. He worked as a schoolteacher and American football coach before moving to New York City. Hunt graduated from the Juilliard School in New York. In 2001, he founded a production company, FourBoys Entertainment, with his wife, American actress Patricia Heaton. They have four sons and they divide their time between Los Angeles and Cambridge. In 2019, Broti Gupta, a writer on Hunt's wife's television show Carol's Second Act, complained that David Hunt had inappropriate contact with her, a claim which Hunt and his lawyer denied. Gupta and another writer subsequently left the show and Hunt underwent work harassment sensitivity training.

Filmography as actor

Film 
 1988 Closing Ranks as Platoon Commander Albert Thom
 1988 The Dead Pool as Harlan Rook
 1989 Nasty Boys as Dale Lofton
 1991 The Black Velvet Gown as Laurence Gallmington
 1992 Just Like a Woman as Police Officer #1
 1993 Trip nach Tunis as Howard Ingham
 1995 Jade as Detective Pat Callendar
 2001 Murder on the Orient Express as Bob Arbuthnot
 2004 Bobby Jones: Stroke of Genius as Dr. Begg (uncredited)
 2006 Amazing Grace as Lord Camden
 2008 The Deal as Grier Clark
 2008 Justice League: The New Frontier as Harry (voice)
 2012 Liz & Dick as Ifor Jenkins
 2014 Moms' Night Out as Cabbie
 2017 Kepler's Dream as Abercrombie

Television 
 1988 Sonny Spoon (1 episode) as Atlas
 1995 The Client (1 episode) as Tom Halstead
 1998–2002 Everybody Loves Raymond (3 episodes) as Bill Parker
 2005 Numb3rs (1 episode) as Elliot Cole
 2005 Monk (1 episode) as Michael Norfleet
 2007 24 (4 episodes) as Darren McCarthy
 2011 Castle (1 episode) as Falco
 2012 Mad Men (episode: "Signal 30") as Edwin Baker
 2015 Transformers: Robots in Disguise as Chop Shop (voice)

References

External links 

Living people
English male film actors
English Presbyterians
English male television actors
Year of birth missing (living people)